The Journal of Communication Management is a quarterly peer-reviewed academic journal covering public relations and published by Emerald Group Publishing. It was established in 1996. The journal is abstracted and indexed in PsycINFO and Scopus. It is a partner of the European Public Relations Education and Research Association and is the preferred publishing partner of the Chartered Institute of Public Relations. The editor-in-chief since 2016 is Jesper Falkheimer (Lund University), taking over from Anne Gregory (Leeds Metropolitan University).

References

External links 
 

Business and management journals
Publications established in 1996
Emerald Group Publishing academic journals
Quarterly journals
English-language journals